John Champe High School is a public High school in Aldie, an unincorporated community in Loudoun County, Virginia, United States. The school was established in 2012. It is named after the revolutionary war hero John Champe who led an unsuccessful attempt to kidnap traitor Benedict Arnold. The campus is just south of U.S. Route 50 and 30 miles west of Washington, D.C. It is part of Loudoun County Public Schools and is located at 41535 Sacred Mountain Street.

History
The school opened primarily to relieve Freedom High School of its overcrowding and to accommodate future development in the Dulles South area. Initially opening with an enrollment of only 609 students (partially due to the lack of a senior class its first year), John Champe's size has more than tripled in the years since. The school temporarily shifted to an intermediate system in the 2018-2019 school year, with Willard Intermediate School serving 8-9th grade and Champe serving 10-12th grade. This ended when Lightridge High School opened its doors in the fall of 2020. In the 2018-2019 school year, John Champe shifted rising freshmen residing in the Brambleton Middle School attendance zones to Rock Ridge High School after a board meeting deciding to move those students temporarily for their ninth grade year instead of transferring to Willard intermediate school.

Demographics
As of the 2012-2013 school year the school's demographics was 47% Caucasian; 29% Asian; 13% African American; 8% Hispanic; 3% multi-racial.

Enrollment history

^ During the 2012-2013 school year there was no senior class.
^^Freshmen class attends Willard Intermediate School until opening of Lightridge High School in 2020.

Campus

The school sits on 97.76 acres just west of the Arcola and Stone Ridge communities.

References

Public high schools in Virginia
Schools in Loudoun County, Virginia
Educational institutions established in 2012
2012 establishments in Virginia